A Parker House roll is a bread roll made by flattening the center of a ball of dough with a rolling pin so that it becomes an oval shape, and then folding the oval in half. They are made with milk and are generally quite buttery, soft, and slightly sweet with a crispy shell.

They were invented at the Parker House Hotel in Boston, during the 1870s. Fannie Farmer gives a recipe for them in her 1896 Boston Cooking-School Cook Book.

The story of their creation has several variations, but they all involve an angry pastry cook throwing unfinished rolls into the oven, which results in their dented appearance. The recipe for Parker House Rolls first started appearing in cookbooks in the 1880s.

See also
 List of regional dishes of the United States

References

 Forbes, Esther, and Arthur Griffin. The Boston Book. Houghton Mifflin Company: 1947.
 Morrisey, Louise Lane, and Marion Lane Sweeney. An Odd Volume of Cookery. Houghton Mifflin Company: 1949.

External links
Omni Parker House recipe on FoodNetwork.com
 1873 reference for the name

Yeast breads
New England cuisine
American breads